Within the Realm of a Dying Sun is the third studio album by Australian band Dead Can Dance. It was released on 27 July 1987 by 4AD.

Background
By this time, Dead Can Dance were predominantly a duo of Lisa Gerrard and Brendan Perry, along with Peter Ulrich, after the departure of Scott Rodger and James Pinker in 1987.

On the sound of the album, the group commented, "We realised we had been limiting our musical visions [before], relying around guitar, bass and drums. These instruments weren't adequate to express a lot of the things we were hearing". On the making of the album, 4AD label owner Ivo Watts-Russell commented, "I think the relationship between them and [producer] John Rivers was at its peak with [Within the Realm of a Dying Sun]. It's probably my favourite record of theirs".

Gerrard's vocals featured prominently on the second half of the album, and her singing style often had mellifluous, mystical overtones, especially on "Cantara".

The cover's photograph was taken in Paris, at the family grave of François-Vincent Raspail at Père-Lachaise cemetery.

Legacy
Vocals from "Dawn of the Iconoclast" were sampled by The Future Sound of London for their 1991 single "Papua New Guinea". 
American pop singer Fergie later also sampled "Dawn of the Iconoclast" for her song "Hungry" featuring Rick Ross, featured on her 2017 album, Double Dutchess. The song interpolated the chant with hip-hop beats and vocals from both artists.  
"Summoning Of The Muse" was sampled by fellow 4AD alumni A.R. Kane for the interlude track "Off Into Space" from their album "i" (1989).
"Xavier" has been covered by British gothic metal band Paradise Lost. This cover is available on the Limited Edition of their 2002 album Symbol of Life.
The opening section of "Anywhere Out of the World" was also used repeatedly as haunting background music in the BBC Horizon episode #30.7 "Hunt For The Doomsday Asteroid" in February 1994, originally broadcast ahead of the predicted impact of Comet Shoemaker-Levy 9 with the planet Jupiter in July that same year.

Track listing

Release history

Personnel

Dead Can Dance
 Lisa Gerrard – vocals (5,6,7,8), all other instruments, production
 Brendan Perry – vocals (1,3,4), all other instruments, production, sleeve design

Additional personnel
 Peter Ulrich – timpani, military snare
 Ruth Watson – oboe
 Gus Ferguson – cello
 Tony Gamage – cello
 John Singleton – trombone
 Richard Avison – trombone
 Andrew Claxton – bass trombone, tuba
 Mark Gerrard – trumpet
 Piero Gasparini – viola
 Alison Harling – violin
 Emlyn Singleton – violin

Technical personnel
 John A. Rivers – production, engineering
 Francisco Cabeza – engineering

Artwork
 Bernard Oudin – sleeve photography

References

External links
 
 

1987 albums
Dead Can Dance albums
4AD albums
Albums produced by John A. Rivers